Riyadh Mezher is a former Iraqi football midfielder who played for Iraq in the 1999 Pan Arab Games. He played for Iraq between 1999 and 2002.

References

Iraqi footballers
Iraq international footballers
Association football midfielders
Living people
Year of birth missing (living people)